Eugene L. Milburn of Memphis, Tennessee was an American billiards champion.

In 1914 he lost the title to Morris D. Brown of Brooklyn. In 1917 he defeated T. Henry Clarkson of Boston, by a score of 400 to 357.

References

American pool players
Year of birth missing
Year of death missing
People from Memphis, Tennessee